Dashkasan (also Romanized as Dāshkasan) is a village in Shiramin Rural District, Howmeh District, Azarshahr County, East Azerbaijan Province, Iran. At the 2006 census, its population was 447, in 117 families.

References 

Populated places in Azarshahr County